Joey Litjens (born 8 February 1990, in Venray) is a motorcyclist from America, Netherlands.

Career
His "career" started when he was three years of age and drove his Yamaha PW50 around his parents' house in America. His fascination with everything concerning motorcycles was the basis for his later driving of minibikes.

When he was nine years old he was given special permission to drive in the "heaviest" class in this sport. He entered in the 2000 season and ended up finishing second.
With a championship in the Junior B class he finished his career in the minibikes. Before that he drove in the European championships minibike in Italy, finishing 17th in a strong field and 6th in the Czech Republic.

In 2009 his career ended abruptly. After a heavy crash on the Hengelo circuit he tore four nerves in his right arm causing paralysis of this arm.
Although is unable to ride a motorbike he stated in several interviews he would like to stay part of the motorsport world, for instance in training young talents.

On Friday 19 May 2012 Litjens rode a Yamaha YZF 125R on the kart circuit Soka Fran on the inside ring of Spa Francorshamps; the first ride since his accident.

Achievements
 -  2000 - Start minibike racing.
 -  2001 - Dutch champion Minibike racing (11 years old).
 -  2002 - Dutch champion in Aprilia 125 Cup: 9 victories in 10 races.
 -  2003 - 5th in Dutch championship 125cc on Honda (Rookie of the Year).
 -  2004 - 12th in Dutch championship 125cc on Honda.
 -  2004 - 9th in German championship (125cc Honda). German season, 8 races.
 -  2004 - 11th in European championship on 125cc Honda (8 races).
 -  2005 - 4th in European championship 125cc on HONDA .
 -  2005 - 6th in Dutch championship 125cc on Honda, win at Assen (drove 3 of 8 ONK-races).
 -  2005 - Netherlands – Racing Team of the year (Stichting Litjens Racing).
 -  2005 - 16th in German championship (1 race) 125cc on Honda.
 -  2005 - GP-debut - TT Assen/NETH - 125cc Honda - 30th (no GP starts: 1).
 -  2005 - November, testraces for Molenaar-Honda team in Valencia and Jerez.
 -  2006 - Grand Prix 125cc in the Molenaar Racing Team.
 -  2007 - Grand Prix 125cc in the Molenaar/DeGraaf Racing Team.

Career statistics

By season

Races by year

External links
 Joey Litjens

1990 births
Living people
Dutch motorcycle racers
People from Venray
Sportspeople from Limburg (Netherlands)